The Chewning House in Green County, Kentucky is listed on the National Register of Historic Places.  The property is located at the northwest corner of the intersection of Kentucky Route 88 and New Salem Road, known as the Donansburg intersection.

It was a two-story dogtrot-style house built in the 1826-1850 period and includes elements of Greek Revival and Federal style.

Google Streetview as of June 2013 shows the house no longer exists;  a chimney remained.

References

Houses on the National Register of Historic Places in Kentucky
Federal architecture in Kentucky
Greek Revival architecture in Kentucky
Houses completed in 1826
National Register of Historic Places in Green County, Kentucky
Dogtrot architecture in Kentucky
1826 establishments in Kentucky
Houses in Green County, Kentucky